Mesechinus is a genus of hedgehogs. It contains four species from East Asia:
 Daurian hedgehog (Mesechinus dauuricus)
 Hugh's hedgehog (Mesechinus hughi)
 Gaoligong forest hedgehog (Mesechinus wangi)
 Small-toothed forest hedgehog (Mesechinus miodon)

References

Hedgehogs
Mammal genera